Dr. Bence Rétvári (born 10 December 1979) is a Hungarian jurist and politician, who served as Secretary of State for Public Administration and Justice between 2 June 2010 and 5 June 2014. He is the current Parliamentary Secretary of State of the Ministry of Human Resources since 15 June 2014.

He became a member of the National Assembly (MP) for Újbuda (Budapest Constituency XV) on 25 February 2008, when replaced András Deák. He joined the Christian Democratic People's Party (KDNP) parliamentary group. He was re-elected MP for Újbuda in the 2010 parliamentary election. He was elected via the Fidesz–KDNP national list in the 2014 parliamentary election. He was elected MP for Vác during the 2018 parliamentary election. He was a member of the Economic and Information Committee in 2008 and of the Parliamentary Committee for Environment between 2008 and 2010.

References

1979 births
Living people
Hungarian jurists
Fidesz politicians
Christian Democratic People's Party (Hungary) politicians
Members of the National Assembly of Hungary (2006–2010)
Members of the National Assembly of Hungary (2010–2014)
Members of the National Assembly of Hungary (2014–2018)
Members of the National Assembly of Hungary (2018–2022)
Members of the National Assembly of Hungary (2022–2026)
Politicians from Budapest